Ryan Mathews (born July 1, 1978) is an American stock car racing driver from Lake Geneva, Wisconsin. He was a part-time driver of the No. 75 Ray Hackett Racing Ford in the NASCAR Craftsman Truck Series in 2009. His career also went through ASA, ARCA, and the NASCAR K&N Pro Series East.

Background
His education background is in engineering from Kettering University in Flint, Michigan.  During his time there he also served as a contributing member of the Kappa Sigma chapter of the Theta Xi fraternity.

He began racing in a kart at age 15. He moved to a mini-sprint car at Wilmot Speedway in Wilmot, Wisconsin, and was the track rookie of the year and fourth overall. He finished second in mini-sprint points at Wilmot in 1996, and fourth overall in the Wisconsin Mini-sprint Association (which included races at the Calumet County Racing Association). He had five wins on the season, and recorded three wins at Wilmot in 1997. Late in 1997 he raced the one mile dirt track at Springfield, Illinois in an ARCA series event.

Matthews moved to the Mid-American SuperTruck Series on asphalt in 1998. He had three Top 5 finishes as a rookie, and two features wins and a pole position in 1999 and 2000. He then moved to the Super Late Models at Slinger Super Speedway in 2001, and was the series Rookie of the Year.

In 2003 he quit his job as an engineer at Harley Davidson to race full-time. He competed in the Midwest All-Star Racing Series (MARS), and he won his fiftieth race on a short track that season. He competed in the Slinger Nationals, and finished fifth against nationally known drivers. Another season highlight was finishing third at Madison International Speedway ahead of Kurt Busch and Matt Kenseth. He moved to the American Speed Association National Series in 2004 as well as selected Super Late Model events. In 2005 he competed in six different Super Late Model series from Minnesota to Florida. He earned 34 top-10s, 17 top-5s, and one win during the 2005 season. He also finished top 5 in points in three major touring series that same year. In 2006 he competed in the ARCA series with Eddie Sharp Racing where his best finish was 2nd at Michigan Speedway.

NASCAR career
Mathews started racing in the Craftsman Truck Series at the seventh race of 2007 for Bill Davis Racing after Tyler Walker was suspended for violating NASCAR's substance abuse policy, and the team had lost its sponsor. He earned his first pole position on July 13, 2007 at Kentucky Speedway, and finished fourth in the race. His other Top 10 finish in 2007 was a sixth-place finish at Memphis Motorsports Park. Mathews competed in one NASCAR event in 2008 for the newly formed CHS Motorsports. The one event was the Chevy Silverado 350K at Texas Motor Speedway.  He would start the race in 34th and finish 33rd. For the 2009 season, Mathews signed on to drive in select races for Ray Hackett Racing in the No. 75 Ford F-150, starting with the WinStar World Casino 400 at Texas Motor Speedway.  He would also drive select races for CHS Motorsports.

Motorsports career results

NASCAR
(key) (Bold – Pole position awarded by qualifying time. Italics – Pole position earned by points standings or practice time. * – Most laps led.)

Camping World Truck Series

K&N Pro Series East

ARCA Re/Max Series
(key) (Bold – Pole position awarded by qualifying time. Italics – Pole position earned by points standings or practice time. * – Most laps led.)

References

External links
 

1978 births
American Speed Association drivers
Living people
NASCAR drivers
ARCA Menards Series drivers
People from Lake Geneva, Wisconsin
Kettering University alumni
Racing drivers from Wisconsin